The Minister's Girlfriend is a Czech comedy film directed by Vladimír Slavínský.

Cast
 Adina Mandlová as Julinka Svobodová
 František Paul as František Hrubý, owner of an import company
 Zdeňka Baldová as Marie Hrubá
 Oldřich Nový as Jan Hrubý
 František Kreuzmann as Head clerk Hrubý's company
 Jaroslav Marvan as Minister of Commerce Jaroslav Horák
 Světla Svozilová as Seamstress Pokorná
 Bedřich Veverka as Mirek Lukeš
 Raoul Schránil as Karel Hájek
 Václav Vydra as Italian supplier R. Rossi-Rosůlek

References

External links
 

1940 films
1940 comedy films
Czechoslovak comedy films
Czech comedy films
Czechoslovak black-and-white films
1940s Czech-language films
1940s Czech films